Parliamentary elections were held in Bulgaria on 4 April 2021 at the end of the term of National Assembly members elected in 2017. Parties in the governing coalition led by Boyko Borisov lost seats and no party leader was able to form a coalition government within the time limit. This triggered the July 2021 Bulgarian parliamentary election.

Background

Electoral system
The 240 members of the National Assembly are elected by open list proportional representation from 31 multi-member constituencies ranging in size from 4 to 16 seats. The electoral threshold is 4% for parties, with seats allocated using the largest remainder method.

Parties and coalitions
The incumbent government was a coalition between the conservative GERB party of Prime Minister Boyko Borisov and the nationalist United Patriots alliance (formed from IMRO, Attack and the NFSB), with the support of the populist Volya Movement. Together they held 132 out of 240 seats in the National Assembly.

During The Greens' 2020 national meeting, the party representatives voted in favor of a coalition at "the next parliamentary election with the other two members of Democratic Bulgaria". The party representatives voted against a "coalition with any of the political parties in the current National Assembly" - namely, GERB, BSP, DPS, Volya and OP.

The deputy chairman of ITN, Toshko Yordanov, said in an interview for the Bulgarian National Radio, that the party "will not enter a coalition with GERB, DPS or BSP".

The cochairman of Democratic Bulgaria, Hristo Ivanov, stated in an interview for bTV, that "there will be no coalition with GERB, whether with or without Borisov".

The chairman of Bulgaria for Citizens Movement, Dimitar Delchev, announced that his party was joining Stand Up.BG during a public presentation of the citizens' platform at Slaveykov Square, in August 2020. The same was done by the chairman of Volt Bulgaria - Nastimir Ananiev, as well as the chairman of the party Movement 21 - Tatyana Doncheva. The citizens' organization The System Kills Us announced their support for Nikola Vaptsarov as their representative within Stand Up.BG.

List
When only some of the leaders of a coalition are its official representatives, their names are in bold. All lines with a light gray background indicate support for a party or coalition that has been agreed upon outside of the official CEC electoral registration.

Opinion polls
The opinion poll results below were recalculated from the original data and exclude pollees that chose 'I will not vote' or 'I am uncertain'.

Notes:

Graphical representation of recalculated data:

Note: The above data does not include Barometer polls, due to claims by other pollsters and media that the agency only has one employee.

Results

By constituency

Voter demographics
Gallup exit polling suggested the following demographic breakdown. The parties which received below 4% of the vote are included in 'Others':

Analysis
Both GERB and BSP had very poor results and there was a large turnover with a third of the seats taken by parties not represented in the previous parliament. A central theme in the election was purported corruption in the GERB-led government, which saw GERB lose seats and various anti-corruption parties gain, most notably Slavi Trifonov's ITN, but also DB and ISMV. The Bulgarian Socialist Party suffered from division between its leader Korneliya Ninova and other factions. The BSP recorded their worst-ever result in a democratic election. The far-right parties also suffered from splits, losing their representation in parliament; the Attack party and the two remaining parties from the United Patriots alliance (the National Front for the Salvation of Bulgaria and Volya Movement) contested the elections separately, with none winning a seat. The three combined results of the three parties suggested they could have crossed the electoral threshold if they had run together.

The election happened during the COVID-19 pandemic, which necessitated a greater focus on online campaigning. Contrary to expectations, voter turnout was broadly unchanged.

Government formation
After his offer of a technocrat government was rejected by the opposition, Borisov said that as leader of the largest party, he would try to form a coalition government, and that he would also be open to supporting an ITN-led government. However, Borisov himself stated he would likely be unsuccessful in forming a coalition, with the likeliest outcomes being either a caretaker government followed by new elections or a coalition of parties new to Parliament.

After former foreign minister Daniel Mitov, whom Boyko Borisov had nominated as GERB's candidate for prime minister, failed to form a government, the mandate was then offered to Slavi Trifonov's ITN. Chess grandmaster Antoaneta Stefanova, whom Trifonov appointed to take the mandate from president Rumen Radev immediately returned it in accordance with Trifonov's wish. Korneliya Ninova of BSPzB formally received the final mandate from president Radev on 5 May 2021, but refused to form a government due to a lack of support from other parliamentary opposition parties. This triggered an early election (to be held on 11 July), and the president appointed a caretaker government led by Stefan Yanev to run the country until the elections are over and a permanent administration is formed.

References

Parliamentary
Bulgaria
2021 04
Bulgaria